The 1953–54 Chicago Black Hawks season was the team's 28th season in the NHL, and they were coming off of a successful season in 1952–53, in which the team set team records in wins (27) and points (69), while earning their first playoff berth since the 1945–46 season.  The Hawks lost to the Montreal Canadiens in seven games in the NHL semi-finals.

The Black Hawks were looking to build on their newfound success, however, the club would open the season with a record of 0–7–1 to quickly fall into last place in the NHL standings.  Wins would be few and far between for the club, as they won consecutive games only thrice throughout the season, and finished the year dead last in the league with a 12–51–7 record, earning 31 points.  The 12 wins was Chicago's fewest since the 1938–39 season, while the 31 points was their lowest total since the 1928–29 season.

Offensively, Chicago was led by Larry Wilson, who had a team high 33 assists and 42 points, while Pete Conacher scored a club best 19 goals.  Defenceman and team captain Bill Gadsby had a career season, scoring 12 goals and 41 points, while getting 108 penalty minutes.  Fellow defenceman Gus Mortson led the team with 132 penalty minutes.

In goal, Al Rollins played in 66 games, winning 12 games, while posting a 3.23 GAA and 7 shutouts.  He was awarded the Hart Trophy for his efforts.

Season standings

Record vs. opponents

Game log

Regular season

Season stats

Scoring leaders

Goaltending

References

Sources
 Hockey-Reference
 National Hockey League Guide & Record Book 2007

Chicago Blackhawks seasons
Chicago Black Hawks season, 1953-54
Chicago